The Savannah is a breed of hybrid cat developed in the late 20th century from crossing a serval (Leptailurus serval) with a domestic cat (Felis catus). This hybridization typically produces large and lean offspring, with the Serval's characteristic large ears and markedly brown-spotted coats. Show-eligible F4–F5 cats range from  however, comparable in size to other large domestic cat breeds such as the Maine Coon or Norwegian Forest cat.

History
On April 7, 1986, Judee Frank crossbred a male serval, belonging to Suzi Wood, with a Siamese domestic cat to produce the first Savannah cat, a female named Savannah. She was bred with a Turkish Angora male and gave birth to viable F2 kittens in April 1989. In 1996, Patrick Kelley and Joyce Sroufe wrote the original version of the Savannah breed standard and presented it to the board of The International Cat Association (TICA). In 2001, the board accepted it as a new registered breed, and in May 2012, TICA accepted the Savannah as an eligible championship breed.

Physical features and breeding techniques

Size 
The Savannah's tall and slim build give them the appearance of greater size than their actual weight. Size is very dependent on generation and sex. Early (F1 and F2) generations are usually the largest due to the stronger genetic influence of the African serval ancestor, usually weighing , although there is considerable financial incentive for breeders to produce F1 cats as large as possible; some are the size of dogs and can weigh  or more, and in the US can fetch very high prices. Like most cat breeds, males tend to be larger than females, and as with other hybrid cat breeds such as the Chausie and Bengal, most F1 Savannah cats will possess many of the exotic traits from the wild (serval) ancestor, which recede in later generations.

Size can vary significantly due to genetic factors, even in the same litter.

Distinctive features 
A Savannah's exotic look is due to the presence of many specific serval characteristics. These include the distinctive color markings; the tall, deeply cupped, wide, rounded and erect ears, long body and legs; fat, puffy noses; and hooded eyes. When a Savannah is standing, its hind end is often higher than its prominent shoulders. The small head is taller than wide, and the cat has a long, slender neck. The back of the ears have ocelli—a central light band bordered by black, dark grey or brown, giving an eye-like effect. The short tail has black rings, with a solid black tip. The eyes are blue in kittens (as in other cats), and may be green, brown, gold or of a blended shade in the adult. The eyes have a "boomerang" shape, with a hooded brow to protect them from harsh sunlight. Ideally, black or dark "tear-streak" or "cheetah tear" markings run from the corner of the eyes down the sides of the nose to the whiskers, much like that of a cheetah.

Coat 
 
The coat of a Savannah should have a spotted pattern, the only pattern accepted by the TICA breed standard. The standard also allows four colors: brown-spotted tabby (cool to warm brown, tan or gold with black or dark brown spots), silver-spotted tabby (silver coat with black or dark grey spots), black (black with black spots), and black smoke (black-tipped silver with black spots).

Other, non-standard patterns and colors can occur, including rosettes, marble, snow (point), blue, cinnamon, chocolate, lilac (lavender) and other diluted colors derived from domestic sources of cat coat genetics.

Outcrossing 
The Savannah breed attained TICA championship status in 2012, which means domestic outcrosses are no longer permitted. Since F1 through F4 Savannah males are sterile, breeders use F5 males to produce the F2 generation with a F1 female. By 2012 most breeders were performing Savannah-to-Savannah pairings, since many fertile F5 Savannah males were by then available for stud, and outcrosses were considered unnecessary and undesirable.

Domestic outcrosses from the early days in the 1990s greatly impacted the breed's development in both desired and non-desired traits. Outcrosses previously permitted for the TICA Savannah breed standard before 2012 were the Egyptian Mau, Ocicat, Oriental Shorthair, and Domestic Shorthair. Outcrosses not permitted included the Bengal and Maine Coon, which brought many unwanted genetic influences.

Reproduction and genetics

As Savannahs are produced by crossbreeding servals and domestic cats, each generation of Savannahs is marked with a filial number. For example, the cats produced directly from a serval × domestic cat cross are termed F1, and they are 50% serval; males are sterile.

F1 generation Savannahs are very difficult to produce, due to the significant difference in gestation periods between the serval and a domestic cat (75 days for a serval and 65 days for a domestic cat) and incompatibilities between the two species' sex chromosomes. Pregnancies are often absorbed or aborted, or kittens are born prematurely. Also, servals can be very picky in choosing mates, and often will not mate with a domestic cat.

Savannah backcrosses, called the BC1 generation, can be as high as 75% serval. Such 75% cats are the offspring of a 50% F1 female bred back to a serval. Cases of 87.5% BC2 Savannah cats are known, but fertility is questionable at those serval percentages. More common than a 75% BC1 is a 62.5% BC1, which is the product of an F2A (25% serval) female bred back to a serval. The F2 generation, which has a serval grandparent and is the offspring of the F1 generation female, ranges from 25% to 37.5% serval. The F3 generation has a serval great grandparent, and is at least 12.5% serval.

The F4 generation is the first generation that can be classified as a "stud book tradition" (SBT) cat and is considered "purebred". A Savannah cross may also be referred to by breeders as "SV × SV" (where SV is the TICA code for the Savannah breed). Savannah generation filial numbers also have a letter designator that refers to the generation of SV-to-SV breeding. The designation A means one parent is a Savannah and the other is an outcross. B is used when both parents are Savannahs, with one of them being an A. The C designation is used when both parents are Savannahs and one of them is a B. Therefore, A × (any SV) = B; B × (B,C,SBT) = C; C × (C, SBT) = SBT, SBT × SBT = SBT. F1 generation Savannahs are always A, since the father is a nondomestic outcross (the serval father). The F2 generation can be A or B. The F3 generation can be A, B or C. SBT cats arise in the F4 generation.

Being hybrids, Savannahs typically exhibit some characteristics of hybrid inviability. Because the male Savannah is the heterogametic sex, they are most commonly affected, in accordance with Haldane's rule. Male Savannahs are typically larger in size and sterile until the F5 generation or so, although the females are fertile from the F1 generation. As of 2011, breeders were noticing a resurgence in sterility in males at the F5 and F6 generations. Presumably, this is due to the higher serval percentage in C and SBT cats. The problem may also be compounded by the secondary nondomestic genes coming from the Asian leopard cat in the Bengal outcrosses that were used heavily in the foundation of the breed.

Females of the F1–F3 generations are usually held back for breeding, with only the males being offered as pets. The reverse occurs in the F5–F7 generations, but to a lesser degree, with the males being held as breeding cats and females primarily offered as pets.

Temperament

Savannah cats are known for their loyalty, and they will follow their owners around the house. They can also be trained to walk on a leash and to fetch.

Breeders report that roughly 50% of first generation savannah kittens exhibit fear and anxious behaviors when initially placed in their new home. These behaviors if not corrected at an early age carry through to adulthood.

An often-noted trait of the Savannah is its jumping ability, and the natural tendency to seek out high places means they are known to jump on top of doors, refrigerators and high cabinets. Savannahs are very inquisitive. They often learn how to open doors and cupboards, and anyone buying a Savannah will likely need to take special precautions to prevent the cat from getting into trouble.

Many Savannah cats do not fear water, and will play or even immerse themselves in water. Some owners even shower with their Savannah cats. Presenting a water bowl to a Savannah may also prove a challenge, as some will promptly begin to "bat" all the water out of the bowl until it is empty, using their front paws.

Health considerations

Hypertrophic cardiomyopathy (HCM) is a health concern in many pure breed cats. The Bengal cat (a similar hybrid) is prone to HCM, and servals may themselves be prone to HCM. Several Bengal breeders have their breeder cats scanned for HCM on an annual basis, though this practice is not as widespread in the Savannah community.

Some veterinarians have noted servals have smaller livers relative to their body sizes than domestic cats, and some Savannahs inherit this, but it is not known to be of any medical consequence. There are no known medical peculiarities of hybrid cats requiring different medical treatments than domestic cats, despite what many breeders may believe. The blood test reference ranges of Savannahs are not known to be different from the typical domestic cat, despite its serval genes.

Like domestic cats, Savannahs and other domestic hybrids require appropriate anesthesia based on their medical needs but do not have specific requirements. It is unclear among the veterinary community why ketamine has been listed as causing ill effects; this is not accurate. It is possible this comes from a misunderstanding of the drug and its common effects, since ketamine cannot be used alone as an anesthetic. Ketamine has been found safe for use in servals together with medetomidine and butorphanol and with the antagonist atipamezole.

Some breeders say that Savannah cats have no known special care or food requirements, while others recommend a diet with no grains or byproducts. Some recommend a partial or complete raw food diet with at least 32% protein and no byproducts. Some recommend calcium and other supplements, especially for growing cats and earlier generations. Others consider it unnecessary or even harmful. The majority of veterinarians, however, argue against grain-free and raw diets for cats as they have been linked to diseases caused by food-borne bacteria or poor nutritional balance.

Ownership laws
Laws governing ownership of Savannah cats in the United States vary according to state. The majority of states follow the code set by the United States Department of Agriculture, which defines wild or domesticated hybrid crosses as domesticated. Some states have set more restrictive laws on hybrid cat ownership, including Hawaii, Massachusetts, Texas and Georgia. Some municipal laws could differ from the state. For example, Savannahs F5 and later generations are allowed by New York state, but not by the city of New York.

The Australian federal government has banned the importation of the Savannah cat into Australia, as the larger cats could potentially threaten species of the country's native wildlife not threatened by smaller domestic cats. A government report on the proposed importation of the cats has warned the hybrid breed may introduce enhanced hunting skills and increased body size into feral cat populations, putting native species at risk.

For similar reasons Savannahs cannot be imported into New Zealand, which has banned importing any hybrid dog or cat other than Bengal cats.

Savannah cats are legal in every province of Canada, although some provinces have restrictions on the ownership of F1 and F2 generations, and importing Savannahs from the United States requires rabies vaccination and special permits.

Many other nations have few or no restrictions on F2 and later generations.

See also
 Bengal cat
 Chausie
 Jungle cat
 Serengeti cat

References

External links

 TICA's Official Savannah Breed Section
 Savannah Cat Association

Cat breeds
Cat breeds originating in the United States
Domestic–wild hybrid cats
Experimental cat breeds
Intergeneric hybrids